Agnieszka Kudziela (born 26 March 1996) is a Polish-born Australian female volleyball player. She is part of the Australia women's national volleyball team.

She participated at the 2014 FIVB Volleyball World Grand Prix.
At club level she played for Queensland in 2014. 
She currently attends Saint Mary's College of California, where she plays for both the indoor- and beach volleyball teams.

References

External links
 Agnieszka Kudziela at FIVB World Grand Prix
 
 

1996 births
Living people
Australian women's volleyball players
Place of birth missing (living people)
Wing spikers
Saint Mary's College of California alumni
Expatriate volleyball players in the United States
Australian expatriate sportspeople in the United States